John Crockett may refer to:

 John Crockett (director) (1918–1986), British stage and television director
 John McClannahan Crockett (1816–1887), mayor of Dallas, Texas and Lieutenant Governor
 John Watkins Crockett Jr. (1818–1874), Confederate politician from Kentucky
 John Wesley Crockett (1807–1852), U.S. Representative from Tennessee
 John Crockett (frontiersman) (1754–?), father of Davy Crockett
 John Crockett (gridiron football) (born 1992), American football running back
 John H. Crockett (1864–1925), American politician in Virginia